The Umbrari is a right tributary of the river Moldova in Romania. It discharges into the Moldova near Verșeni.

References

Rivers of Romania
Rivers of Neamț County
Rivers of Iași County